Robert Hale (12 February 1702 (o.s.) – 20 March 1767) was a doctor and military officer from Beverly, Massachusetts.

Biography
Hale graduated from Harvard in 1721 and later practiced as a physician in Beverly. He commanded a regiment under William Pepperrell at the Siege of Louisbourg in 1745. In 1747, he was appointed by the legislature of Massachusetts a commissioner to New York to adopt measures for the general defence, and in 1755 was a commissioner to New Hampshire to plan an expedition against the French. He was appointed sheriff of Essex County, Massachusetts, in 1761, and was for 13 years a member of the legislature.

Notes

References
 
  Here he is referred to as Robert Hale Jr.

Attribution
 

1702 births
1767 deaths
People from Beverly, Massachusetts
Military personnel from colonial Massachusetts
Physicians from Massachusetts
Sheriffs of Essex County, Massachusetts
Members of the colonial Massachusetts House of Representatives
Harvard University alumni
18th-century American physicians
People of colonial Massachusetts
18th-century American politicians